Dùn Beic is a dun located on the Inner Hebridean island of Coll. The etymology of the dun's name is uncertain; one possibility is that it could be made up of a personal name. The dun appears in local legend as being one of several fortresses held by Norsemen, who were defeated in battle against the ancestor of the Macleans of Coll. There have been several archaeological finds at Dùn Beic; these include pieces of flint, burnt bone, and fragments of incised pottery.

Etymology
The early 20th century antiquary Erskine Beveridge was uncertain of the etymology of Dùn Beic. He noted that Beic is pronounced "Veyik" and speculated that it could be the Gaelic for "peak" or "beak". He also considered the possibility that the name could possibly be of non-Gaelic origin. Another possibility he considered was that it could represent a proper name and noted a historical figure—a Dál Riatan king named Béc. According to the 19th century historian W. F. Skene, Béc was the head of the branch of Cenél nGabráin, who possessed the southern half of Kintyre. Skene stated that they were descended from Conaing, one of the sons of Áedán mac Gabráin. Béc is recorded in the Annals of Ulster as being killed in the year 707 ("Béc grandson of Dúnchad was killed").  According to Beveridge, he was slain by members of Cenél Loairn.

Description

Dùn Beic is located on the Inner Hebridean island of Coll.

A dun is a building, or enclosed settlement, with a circular stone wall; usually situated on an elevated position. Dùn Beic's wall runs around the margin of the summit, though it has almost completely disappeared from sight. The wall's course in the southwest and west is marked by a grassy bank.

In 1903, Beveridge stated that upon the summit there were the scanty remains of several small buildings. In the centre of the west-most building, Beveridge dug a hole and found several round or oval stones which measured on average about an inch in length. When the site was visited by the Ordnance Survey (OS) in 1972, there was no evidence for any of these buildings. In 1980, a group representing the Royal Commission on the Ancient and Historical Monuments of Scotland (RCAHMS) visited the site and their survey of the interior of the dun described much of it as being unsuitable for habitation because of the rocky outcrops. The RCAHMS group discerned that the rest of the summit was occupied by a single building, of which only the foundation remains. This building lies on its long axis northwest and southeast. Near the centre of the north-eastern wall, there is an entrance which leads to an irregular hollow between two outcrops.

Below the cliff, in the east, there is a natural gully within the rock. Beveridge stated that this natural rampart was likely artificially strengthened; however, the OS found no evidence to support this. The OS group could not find any evidence for an entrance to the dun, but noted that it was presumed to have been located in the northeast.

Archaeological finds

In 1903, Beveridge excavated the centre of one of the buildings he claimed to have been located at the summit. He found several round or oval stones which measured on average about an inch in length; and noted that such finds were commonly found on the duns of Coll and Tiree. Along the southwest edge of the dun, upon the top of the cliff, Beveridge found more of the same pebbles, as well as many fragments of hammerstones and pottery (some of which he described as "well patterned"). Along the dun's almost non-existent walls, he found two pieces of flint (although he consented that they were rough and of poor quality). Beveridge noted that finds of flint were scarce throughout the duns on Coll and the nearby island of Tiree.

The OS team which visited the site in 1972 noted that there were many fragments of pottery in the area, particularly on the western side, where the remains of part of a flat-bottomed pot were found. Another fragment, decorated with horizontal grooves, was found on site. These finds were described as being typical of the coarse gritty ware found in other locations on Coll. In 1975–76, Iron Age sherds and slag from the site were donated to the National Museum of Antiquities of Scotland (NMAS) by the RCAHMS. This find included four decorated rim sherds, which were found within the dun.

Dùn Beic in Coll tradition

In the late 19th and early 20th centuries, several Coll traditions were published which concerned several fortifications (hillforts, duns, and crannogs) on the island—one of which was Dùn Beic. One such tradition was collected by Rev. John Gregorson Campbell, a former parish minister of Tiree, and published in 1895 Campbell's version runs as follows:

According to Beveridge in 1903, the forts mentioned within this tradition are Dùn Anlaimh, a crannog in Loch nan Cinneachan; Dùn Beic; and Dùn Dubh. The Iain Garbh mentioned was a son of Lachlann Bronnach, chief of the Macleans of Duart (d. after 1472). Iain Garbh (b.  1450) is claimed to be the ancestor of the Macleans of Coll. Beveridge also made note of traditions of another battle fought near Grishipol, in which Iain Garbh and his followers defeated a force led by his step-father Gilleonan, chief of the MacNeils of Barra. Beveridge reasoned that this particular battle against the MacNeils probably took place around 1470–1480; and wondered if there could be some sort of confusion between this conflict with the MacNeils and that of the Norsemen.
In 1903, without prior knowledge to Campbell's tradition, Beveridge published another version of the 'Norsemen tradition' quoted above; one in which he had obtained viva voce. According to Beveridge, the events within this version of the tradition were said to have taken place at the precise date of 1384. However, he conceded that this date was calculated by the fact that when the Macleans of Coll sold their estate on the island in 1854, it was believed that they had owned their lands there for exactly 472 years. Beveridge also noted that the first historical connection between any Maclean and the island of Coll appears in a charter of confirmation, dated 1495, which states the Macleans were granted a charter to the island in 1409. Beveridge's version of the tradition runs as follows:

A version very similar to Beveridge's appears in the 1906 monograph written by Rev. Dugald MacEchern which was published in 1922. MacEchern acknowledges the work of Beveridge and his version runs as follows:

References

Archaeological sites in the Northern Inner Hebrides
Coll
Fortifications in Scotland
Prehistoric sites in Scotland